Rearviewmirror (Greatest Hits 1991–2003) is a two-disc compilation album by the American rock band Pearl Jam, released on November 16, 2004 through Epic Records. The album has been certified platinum by the RIAA in the United States. It was reissued in 2013 as The Essential Pearl Jam.

Overview
The compilation debuted at number 16 on the Billboard 200 chart, selling 96,000 copies in its first week of release. rearviewmirror (Greatest Hits 1991–2003) has been certified platinum by the RIAA.

The album's two discs are both devoted to different sides of the band's catalogue: the first disc, or "Up Side", contains heavier rock songs while the second disc or "Down Side" consists of slower songs and ballads. Both discs are in chronological order, with the exception of the last song on the "Down Side", regular show closer "Yellow Ledbetter".

The tracks "Once", "Alive", and "Black" were remixed by Brendan O'Brien. Pearl Jam's version of the Victoria Williams song "Crazy Mary" was supposed to appear on disc two, but was replaced with "Man of the Hour" before release. This release marked the end of Pearl Jam's contractual agreement with Epic Records.

AllMusic staff writer Stephen Thomas Erlewine gave the album four and a half out of five stars. He said that the album "does an expert job not only of capturing the moment when Pearl Jam were monstrously popular, but proving that they still turned out good music even when they were fading from the spotlight. Unlike most career-spanning, multi-disc retrospectives, Rearviewmirror does not emphasize latter-day albums in order to achieve a sense of balance that's inherently phony." Rolling Stone staff writer Christian Hoard gave the album four out of five stars, saying, "Pearl Jam have spent much of this decade courting devotees with a series of live bootlegs, so Rearviewmirror is a welcome concession to casual fans, rounding out the hits with concert staples and non-album cuts. The rockers on the "Up Side" disc sum up the band's continually evolving relationship with effects pedals and emotional catharsis; the slower "Down Side" disc offers gold sounds that are long on big choruses and well-worn sincerity."

Track listing

Personnel

Pearl Jam
Stone Gossard – guitars
Jeff Ament – bass guitar, album concept, additional booklet photos
Eddie Vedder – vocals, guitars
Mike McCready – guitars
Dave Krusen – drums on Ten, "Yellow Ledbetter"
Dave Abbruzzese – drums on Singles: Original Motion Picture Soundtrack, Vs., Vitalogy
Jack Irons – drums on Merkin Ball, No Code, Yield
Matt Cameron – drums on "Last Kiss", Binaural, Riot Act, "Man of the Hour"

Additional musicians and production
Matt Bayles, John Burton, Caram Costanzo, Don Gilmore, Dave Hillis, Sam Hofstedt, Adrian Moore, Adam Samuels, Kevin Scott, Trina Shoemaker, Ashley Stubbert – engineering
Tchad Blake – production, mixing
Nick DiDia – mixing, engineering
Brett Eliason – production, mixing, engineering
Boom Gaspar – Hammond B3, Fender Rhodes on Riot Act
Adam Kasper – production, engineering
Brad Klausen – design and layout
Bob Ludwig at Gateway Mastering – mastering
Lance Mercer – photos
Brendan O'Brien – production, mixing, engineering; bass guitar on "I Got Id", pipe organ, Hammond organ, piano; remixing on "Once", "Alive", and "Black"
Tim Palmer – mixing
Rick Parashar – production, engineering
Pearl Jam – production
George Webb – equipment manager
Neil Young – guitar on "I Got Id"

Chart positions

Weekly charts

Decade-end chart

Certifications

References

External links
rearviewmirror (Greatest Hits 1991–2003) information and lyrics at pearljam.com

2004 greatest hits albums
Albums produced by Brendan O'Brien (record producer)
Albums produced by Rick Parashar
Albums produced by Tchad Blake
Pearl Jam compilation albums
Epic Records compilation albums
Albums produced by Adam Kasper
Albums produced by Stone Gossard
Albums produced by Eddie Vedder
Albums produced by Jeff Ament
Albums produced by Mike McCready
Albums produced by Matt Cameron
Albums produced by Dave Krusen
Albums produced by Dave Abbruzzese
Albums produced by Jack Irons